The Armenian Center for National and International Studies (ACNIS) is an independent research center based in Yerevan. It is the institutional initiative of Raffi Hovannisian, Armenia’s former Minister of Foreign Affairs. Founded in 1994. The institution focuses on foreign and public policy issues.

Publications
 Hayatsk Yerevanits, Monthly Journal of Public Policy, since 1995.
 Prospects for regional and transregional cooperation and the resolution of conflicts, report.
 Armenia 2020: A strategy paper for development and security (in Armenian), 2002
 Armenian-Azerbaijani relations: Realities and prospects, by Alexander Grigorian,
 Armenia-Turkey: Models of trade and economic relations, by Dr. Toros Torosian,
 The politics of Genocide:State policy and national perceptions, by Dr. Stepan Poghosian; etc.

External links
Official site

Research institutes in Armenia